Joseph Fifamè Djogbénou (born 20 March 1969), is a Beninese politician, lawyer and academic who is the current President of the Progressive Union for Renewal party. Djogbénou was the  President of the Constitutional Court of Benin from 7 June 2018 until his resignation on 12 July 2022. He was the personal lawyer of Patrice Talon. He was Minister of Justice between 2016 and 2018.

References

1969 births
Living people
21st-century Beninese politicians
Progressive Union for Renewal politicians